Stand to Reason may refer to:

 Stand to Reason (UK charity), a mental health charity
 A Christian apologetics organization founded by Greg Koukl